The 1906 Ole Miss Rebels football team represented the University of Mississippi during the 1906 Southern Intercollegiate Athletic Association football season. Games with Tennessee on October 27 and with Arkansas on November 17 were canceled. This the first season of the legal forward pass.  James C. Elmer of Ole Miss caught the first forward pass in the history of the Egg Bowl rivalry. Elmer's kicking accounted for 13 points in a 29–5 rout. For the first time the game marked the end of the season for not one but both teams.

Schedule

References

Ole Miss
Ole Miss Rebels football seasons
Ole Miss Rebels football